Rod Dana (born Roger Francke; 8 August 1934) is an American former actor, writer and model, mainly active in Italian cinema.

Life and career 
Born in Vernal, Utah, Dana started his career as a runway and photographic model in the late 1950s. After occasionally appearing in minor roles in a number of B-movies, he moved to Italy to pursue an acting career. In the second half of the 1960s starred in a number of genre films, mainly Eurospy and Spaghetti Western films, often credited as Robert Mark. In 2003 Dana wrote a novel, Conversations with the Devil: Dialogues with the Soul, under the pen name Jon Christian Eagle.

Filmography

References

External links 
 

1934 births
People from Vernal, Utah
20th-century American male actors
American emigrants to Italy
American male film actors
Male models from Utah
Living people
Male actors from Utah